Muhlenberg Park may refer to:

 Muhlenberg Park, Pennsylvania, an unincorporated community in Muhlenberg Township, Pennsylvania
 Muhlenberg Park (Washington, D.C.), a small public park in northwest Washington, D.C., where the Peter Muhlenberg Memorial is located